Port Medway is a community in the Canadian province of Nova Scotia, located in the Region of Queens Municipality.

History
Was early settled by United Empire Loyalists via Land Petitions/Memorials in the 1780s per N.S. Archives

Because of its deep harbor, the town originally housed a significant wooden shipbuilding industry owned by the Wylde family. At its most prosperous, over 5,000 inhabitants lived and worked there. When the industry disappeared the population dwindled to a few hundred residents.

After the historic lighthouse was decommissioned, it was purchased by Queens County and restored in 2002.

More details on Port-Medway.

Nova Scotia Archives Letson Album, Port Medway

Communities in the Region of Queens Municipality
General Service Areas in Nova Scotia